Mana Pools National Park is a 219,600 ha wildlife conservation area and national park in northern Zimbabwe. It is a region of the lower Zambezi River in Zimbabwe where the flood plain turns into a broad expanse of lakes after each rainy season.  As the lakes gradually dry up and recede, the region attracts many large animals in search of water, making it one of Africa's most renowned game-viewing regions.

The park was inscribed, in conjunction with the Sapi Safari Area (118,000 ha) and Chewore Safari Area (339,000 ha) as a single UNESCO World Heritage Site (for a total of  676,600 ha) in 1984. The Mana Pools were designated a Ramsar wetland of international importance on 3 January 2013. Mana Pools National Park is a World Heritage Site based on its pure wilderness and beauty. It is home to a wide range of mammals, over 350 bird species, and aquatic wildlife, and is one of the world's wildest and best preserved natural ecological areas.

Ecology
Mana means ‘four’ in Shona, in reference to the four large permanent pools formed by the meanderings of the middle Zambezi. These 2,500 square kilometres of river frontage, islands, sandbanks and pools, flanked by forests of mahogany, wild figs, ebonies and baobabs, is one of the least developed national parks in Southern Africa. It has the country's biggest concentration of hippopotami and crocodiles and large dry season mammal populations of the zebra, elephant and Cape buffalo. The area is also home to other threatened species including the lion, cheetah, Cape wild dog, and near-threatened species including leopard and the brown hyena.

When the area was inscribed by UNESCO, it was one of the most important refuges for eastern black rhinoceros populations in Africa, with about 500 animals. By 1994, poaching had reduced these to just 10 remaining rhinos, which were removed to another area for their protection.

Conservation
The area was saved from a hydro-electric scheme in the early eighties which would have seen the flooding of the area. The area's ecology is affected by the regulation of the Kariba Dam and there are concerns that another potential dam on the Zambezi River, in the Mapata Gorge, might dramatically undermine the value of the area. Recently, the area was again saved from the Mupata Gorge hydro-electric scheme, where the chosen project was the Batoka Dam instead.

Surrounding area
The park is contiguous with Zambia's Lower Zambezi National Park on the opposite side of the Zambezi River, and the larger UNESCO area is contiguous with the Urungwe Safari Area (287,000 ha), the Dande Safari Area (52,300 ha) and the Doma Safari Area (76,400 ha).

See also

 Chitake River
 Zambezi Escarpment

References

External links

Mana Pools - Zimbabwe Parks & Wildlife Authority

Gallery

National parks of Zimbabwe
World Heritage Sites in Zimbabwe
Geography of Mashonaland West Province
Zambezi River
Ramsar sites in Zimbabwe
Tourist attractions in Mashonaland West Province
Zambezian and mopane woodlands